Benoît Paire won the title, defeating Lucas Pouille in the final 6–4, 1–6, 7–6(9–7) .

Seeds

Draw

Finals

Top half

Bottom half

References
 Main Draw
 Qualifying Draw

Internationaux de Tennis de Vendee
Internationaux de Tennis de Vendée